Proschaliphora albida is a moth in the subfamily Arctiinae. It was described by George Hampson in 1909. It is found in Mozambique, Namibia and South Africa.

References

Moths described in 1909
Arctiini